Kamil Ulman  (born 21 April 1983 in Białystok) is a Polish football player.

Career

Club
He was born in Białystok and began his professional career with Jagiellonia Białystok. He signed with Vyzas in January 2008.

In February 2011, he joined GKP Gorzów Wlkp.

Varia
Kamil Ulman is an active duty private in Polish Army.

References

External links
 
 Profile at Hellenic League 

1983 births
Living people
Polish footballers
Jagiellonia Białystok players
ŁKS Łomża players
Vyzas F.C. players
Stilon Gorzów Wielkopolski players
Sportspeople from Białystok
Association football goalkeepers